The Qualicum First Nation is a First Nations band government located in Qualicum Bay at the mouth of the Big Qualicum River, near Qualicum Beach on Vancouver Island, British Columbia, Canada.

Chief and Councillors

Demographics
The Qualicum First Nation has 128 members. As of 2016 Census, there were 74 individuals living on the reserve.

The Qualicum First Nation camp-ground opens every summer and closes every fall on part of the ocean-front property - a popular campsite and one of few with ocean views and full R.V hook-ups as well.

The Qualicum First Nation also owns and operates a licensed daycare facility which is open to the public.

See also

Douglas Treaties
Qualicum River

References

Coast Salish governments
Mid Vancouver Island